Pon. Vijayaraghavan is a politician from Kanyakumari district.

MLA elections
He was elected to Tamil Nadu legislative assembly three times from Kanyakumari district. He was elected from Killiyur constituency as a Janata Party candidate in 1977 election, as a Janata Party (JP) candidate in 1980 election and as an Independent candidate in 1989 election.

MP elections
He lost 1980 and 1984 elections as a Janata Party candidate against N. Dennis in Nagercoil Lok Sabha constituency. He lost the 1985 by-election as a Janata Party candidate against R. Dhanushkodi Adithan in Tiruchendur constituency.

See also
 Nagercoil (Lok Sabha constituency)

References

People from Kanyakumari district
Tamil Nadu politicians
Living people
Janata Party politicians
Year of birth missing (living people)
Members of the Tamil Nadu Legislative Assembly
Bharatiya Janata Party politicians from Tamil Nadu